Ross McLennan may refer to: 

Ross McLennan (singer), Australian singer, formerly with Snout
Ross McLennan (drummer), Australian drummer with The Predators